Chernihiv is a city in northern Ukraine, capital of the eponymous district and province

Chernihiv may also refer to:

Places
 Chernihiv Raion, a district in Chernihiv Oblast, Ukraine
 Chernihiv Oblast, a province in Ukraine
 Chernihiv Okruha (early 20th-century), a district in Chernihiv Governorate, People's Republic of Ukraine
 Chernihiv Governorate (early 20th-century), a prefecture of the People's Republic of Ukraine
 Chernihiv Regiment, a commandery territory of the Empire of Russia
 Chernihiv Voivodeship, a province of Ruthenia, Poland-Lithuania
 Grand Principality of Chernihiv, Kievan Rus

Facilities and structures
 Chernihiv Airport, Chernihiv, Ukraine
 Chernihiv Air Base, Chernihiv, Ukraine
 Chernihiv railway station, Chernihiv, Ukraine
 Chernihiv Central Bus Station, Chernihiv, Ukraine
 Chernihiv Stadium, Chernihiv, Ukraine; a multipurpose stadium
 Chernihiv Arena, Chernihiv, Ukraine; a soccer stadium
 Chernihiv Philharmony, Chernihiv, Ukraine; a Philharmony
 Chernihiv Bus Factory, Chernihiv, Ukraine; a company

Ships
 , a Soviet and then Ukrainian Navy ship
 , a Soviet then Ukrainian then Crimean Navy ship

Sports
 BC Chernihiv, Chernihiv, Chernihiv, Chernihiv, Ukraine; a basketball team
 FC Desna Chernihiv, Chernihiv, Chernihiv, Chernihiv, Ukraine; a soccer team
 FC Chernihiv, Chernihiv, Chernihiv, Chernihiv, Ukraine; a soccer team
 FC Yunist Chernihiv, Chernihiv, Chernihiv, Chernihiv, Ukraine; a soccer youth team
 FC Desna-2 Chernihiv, Chernihiv, Chernihiv, Chernihiv, Ukraine; a soccer youth under 21 team
 FC Desna-3 Chernihiv, Chernihiv, Chernihiv, Chernihiv, Ukraine; a soccer youth under 19 team

Other uses
 Siege of Chernihiv (2022), during the Russian invasion of Ukraine

See also

 Ancient Chernihiv, an architectural park in Chernihiv, Ukraine
 Chernihiv Polytechnic National University, Chernihiv, Ukraine
 
 Chernivtsi (disambiguation)
 Chernigov (disambiguation)